Hon. Aden Bare Duale is a Kenyan politician currently serving as the Minister of Defense in the cabinet of President William Ruto since 2022.

A former Member of the National Assembly for Garissa Township Constituency, Duale served as the Majority Leader of the National Assembly under the Jubilee Party in the 11th Parliament from 2013 to 2017 and in the 12th Parliament from 2017 to 2020, when he was ousted for perceived disloyalty to former President Uhuru Kenyatta, the Jubilee Party leader. He was elected first in 2007 under the Orange Democratic Movement (ODM), but left the party in 2009, teaming up with Ruto to form the United Republican Party.

Early life and education
Duale received his Certificate of Primary Education (CPE) from Garissa Primary School in 1981. He then enrolled in Garissa High School where he received his Kenya Certificate of Secondary Education (KCSE) in 1985, and later joined Moi Forces Academy for his Kenya Advanced Certificate of Secondary Education (KACSE), which he completed in 1987. He enrolled in Moi University for his undergraduate studies in education before transferring to Jomo Kenyatta University of Agriculture & Technology for his master's degree in business administration (MBA).

Early career
In 1992, Duale began his teaching career as a graduate teacher at Sankuri Secondary School. He did, however, leave after two months and thereafter worked for six months as a clerical officer at the office of the provincial commissioner in Garissa. After that, he worked for their family business until becoming a director for Kenya Broadcasting Cooperation from 1999 to 2003. He is the Livestock Marketing Society of Kenya's co-founder and CEO.

Political career

Member of the National Assembly
Duale has served as a representative of the Dujis Constituency in the National Assembly of Kenya since the 2007 parliamentary elections. After initially being elected with the Orange Democratic Movement, he switched parties for the 2013 elections, and won re-election as a member of the United Republican Party. He also served as an assistant minister in the Ministry of Livestock Development between 2008 and 2013. In the 11th Parliament he was a member of the House Business and House Broadcasting Committees, while in the 12th Parliament he was a member of the House Business Committee.

During his time as leader of the majority, Duale was the sponsor of an unsuccessful 2018 bill that would have reserved one in three seats in parliament for women.

Early in his tenure as Minister of Defence, Duale officially deployed troops to eastern Democratic Republic of Congo to join an East African Community Joint Regional Force aiming to combat armed groups in the region.

Political positions
In 2014, Duale argued that homosexuality in Kenya was "as serious as terrorism", but argued against stepping up legal sanctions on the grounds that the Kenyan constitution and the penal code were tough enough.

Personal life
Diale has a wife and five sons. His eldest son is in university while the youngest is in kindergarten.

References

1969 births
Living people
People from Garissa County
Kenyan people of Somali descent
United Republican Party (Kenya) politicians
Members of the 11th Parliament of Kenya
Moi University alumni